Global Policy is a peer-reviewed academic journal based at the Global Policy Institute, School of Government and International Affairs, Durham University and focusing on the "point where ideas and policy meet", published in association with Wiley-Blackwell.

The journal was launched at the 4th Global Public Policy Network conference at the London School of Economics and Political Science on Monday 22 March 2010, with near simultaneous launch events held in Beijing and Brussels. The theme of the one-day conference was "Global Challenges: Global Impact". The General Editors are David Held, Eva-Maria Nag and Dani Rodrik.

Its first issue included articles by UK Development Secretary Douglas Alexander, General David Petraeus, Head of US Central Command, Mary Kaldor and Ian Goldin and Tiffany Vogel of Oxford University.

The journal's first edition defines its six main foci
 Globally relevant risks and collective action problems
 International policy coordination
 Normative theories of global governance
 The change from national-level to 'bloc'-level policy making
 The transition from single-polar to multipolar governance
 Innovations in global governance

According to the Journal Citation Reports, the journal has a 2014 impact factor of 0.603, ranking it 95th out of 161 journals in the category "Political Science" and 49th out of 85 journals in the category "International Relations".

External links 
 
 Wiley-Blackwell

References 

Political science journals
Publications established in 2010
English-language journals
Wiley-Blackwell academic journals
International relations journals
Quarterly journals